Lesko or Leško is a surname. Notable people with the surname include:

Adrián Leško (born 1995), Slovak footballer
Anna Lesko (born 1979), American singer
Artur Lesko (born 1984), Belarusian footballer
Dávid Leško (born 1988), Slovak footballer
Debbie Lesko (born 1958), American politician
Ján Leško (born 1986), Slovak footballer
John Lesko (born 1988), American soccer player
Leonard H. Lesko (born 1938), American Egyptologist
Marina Lesko, Russian journalist
Mark Lesko (born 1967), American politician
Matthew Lesko (born 1943), American author
Peter Leško (born 1991), Slovak footballer